The Hausberg Gondola Lift runs from Garmisch-Partenkirchen in South Germany up to the Hausberg mountain and the "Classic" ski area of Hausberg-Alpspitze. It belongs to the Bayerische Zugspitzbahn company and is only operated in winter.

The old Hausberg cableway built by PHB went into service in 1969. It was a cable car with two cabins, each with a capacity of 70 people, and operated until the end of the 2005/06 winter season. For the 2006/07 winter season it was replaced by a gondola lift by Doppelmayr. With its 66 cabins by CWA each for 8 people it has a transport capacity of 2,400 passengers an hour. It is driven by an electric motor in the valley station and held at a constant tension by hydraulic tensioning apparatus in the valley station. The garage for the cabins is in the mountain station.

External links 
 Fact sheet of the Zugspitzbahn AG, about the Hausberg Cable Car and others 
 Description of the old Hausbergbahn at Seilbahngeschichte.de 
 Beschreibung und Fotodokumentation at Remontées mécaniques 

Gondola lifts in Germany
Garmisch-Partenkirchen
Transport in Bavaria